The Indian Bully Kutta (also known as Indian Mastiff or Indian Bully)  is a type of large dog that originated in the Indian subcontinent, dating back to the 16th century. The Bully Kutta is a working dog used for hunting and guarding. The type is popular in the Punjab region of India and Pakistan, including Haryana and Delhi, as well as in Maharashtra and Tamil Nadu.
The Indian National Kennel Club, along with the Indian Mastiff Registry, recognizes this breed officially.

Name and description 

Bully Kutta literally translates to "heavily wrinkled dog". The word "Bully" comes from the root word of the Hindustani and Punjabi languages "Bohli" which means heavily wrinkled. "Kutta" means dog in the Hindi-Urdu language.

The Sindhi mastiff resembles the mastiff, and is notable for its hardiness and size. The colour is black and white with some red in places. The tail curls up and is long and bushy, with the coat being long and thick.

The “pocket” bully is a small version of an American Bully They are more compact and shorter about 14-17″ tall.

History
The Bully Kutta originated in the Indian subcontinent, either in the Thanjavur and Tiruchi districts of Madras or the Sind region of medieval India. In Thanjavur, the Bully Kutta was a favorite pet of ruling families. The Mughal emperor Akbar owned a Bully Kutta, which he used for hunting.

The Second International Dog Show at Islington Agricultural Hall, held on 28 May 1864 in London, showcased the Indian Mastiff among several other dog breeds. The previous year, Edward, the Prince of Wales, and Princess Alexandra, entered an Indian Mastiff in the same show, along with a Newfoundland, Russian Tracker and two Borzois. In 1884, Littell's Living Age said that historically, a "large Indian mastiff" was employed by kings "in the chase of wild beasts".

Temperament 
Bully Kuttas have been described as intelligent, alert, responsive, energetic and aggressive. A well-known veterinary Dr. L.N. Gupta from Agra, India has stated that Bully Kuttas are a dominating canine and should only be handled by well-experienced owners.

The American Humane Association has stated that "on tests conducted in 2009 by the American Temperament Test Society, bullies scored better than several breeds that are rarely associated with aggression, including beagles and collies."  However, this is misleading, as the ATTS test is not an aggression test, it tests "different aspects of temperament such as stability, shyness, aggressiveness, and friendliness as well as the dog’s instinct for protectiveness towards its handler and/or self-preservation in the face of a threat", and Beagles and Collies fail the test not due to aggression, but due to fear of hostile strangers.

Use as a fighting dog 
Bully Kuttas have been illegally used for dog fighting in India and Pakistan, including areas such as Delhi, Gurugram, and Noida. In June 2018, police in Indian Punjab filed First Information Report (FIR) for the first time against organizers of a dog fight. Many non-profit organizations are now working against illegal fighting and creating awareness among the people.

Popularity 
The Bully Kutta is popular in the Punjab region of India and Pakistan. In India, breeders from Punjab, Haryana, Rajasthan, Tamilnadu and Maharashtra focusing on scientific breeding of this dog under the guidelines of Indian Mastiff Registry.   They have been part of many competitions in India. According to the Times of India, it has importance among Indian youth of having a macho image.

See also
 Dogs portal
 List of dog breeds
 List of dog breeds from India

References

Notes

Citations

Further reading

External links 

 Bully Kutta - Canine Heritage

Dog breeds originating in India
Dog breeds originating in Pakistan
Dog fighting breeds
Hunting dogs